The 1998 Sultan Azlan Shah Cup was the eighth edition of field hockey tournament the Sultan Azlan Shah Cup.

Participating nations
Six countries participated in the tournament:

Final ranking
This ranking does not reflect the actual performance of the team as the ranking issued by the International Hockey Federation. This is just a benchmark ranking in the Sultan Azlan Shah Cup only.

References

External links
Official website

1998 in field hockey
1998
1998 in Malaysian sport
1998 in Australian sport
1998 in English sport
1998 in South Korean sport
1998 in New Zealand sport
1998 in German sport